Preobrazhensky (masculine), Preobrazhenskaya (feminine), or Preobrazhenskoye (neuter) is the name of several rural localities in Russia:
Preobrazhensky, Krasnoyarsk Krai, a settlement in Nazarovsky District of Krasnoyarsk Krai
Preobrazhensky, Novosibirsk Oblast, a settlement in Chulymsky District of Novosibirsk Oblast
Preobrazhensky, name of several other rural localities
Preobrazhenskaya, Republic of Bashkortostan, a village in Iglinsky District of the Republic of Bashkortostan
Preobrazhenskaya, Volgograd Oblast, a stanitsa in Kikvidzensky District of Volgograd Oblast
Preobrazhenskaya, name of several other rural localities
Preobrazhenskoye, Republic of Adygea, a selo in Krasnogvardeysky District of the Republic of Adygea
Preobrazhenskoye, Ivanovo Oblast, a selo in Yuzhsky District of Ivanovo Oblast
Preobrazhenskoye, name of several other rural localities

Abolished inhabited localities
Preobrazhenskoye, Kamchatka Oblast, a selo in Aleutsky District of Kamchatka Oblast; abolished in the 1960s